Dimasalang, officially the Municipality of Dimasalang,  is a 4th class municipality in the province of Masbate, Philippines. According to the 2020 census, it has a population of 24,909 people.

In 1951 the barrios of Palanas, Nipa, Nabangig, Banco, Pina, Maanahao, Salvacion, Antipolo, Malatawan, Intusan, Miabas, San Antonio, Libtong, Malibas, Santa Cruz, Bontod, and Cabil-isan were separated to form the town of Palanas.

Geography

Barangays
Dimasalang is politically subdivided into 20 barangays.

Climate

Demographics

Economy

References

External links
 [ Philippine Standard Geographic Code]
Philippine Census Information
Local Governance Performance Management System 

Municipalities of Masbate